This is a list of women who have won the Miss World Malaysia beauty pageant.

Titleholders 
The following is a list of top 3 winners from 1963 to present. No pageant was held in 1967 to 1969, 1990, 2017 and 2020.

List of Miss World Malaysia titleholders

List of Runners-up

Trivia

National Directors 

 Mr. Paul Lee
 Datuk Vincent Lee
 Dato Anna Lin Mei Yoke (2013–2016)
 Dr. Sean Wong (2018–present)

Franchise Holder 

 Far East Beauty Congress / Miss Orient Pte. Ltd. (1963–1989)
 Naga DDB Needham Dik
 Meridian Surf Sdn. Bhd. (2013–2016)
Fantastic Golden Sdn. Bhd. (2018–present)

Board of Directors 

 Tan Sri V. Jeyaratnam – President of Far East Beauty Congress
 Mr. Paul Lee – Executive Director of Far East Beauty Congress
 Mr. Sunny Hoh – Executive Producer of Far East Beauty Congress
 Mrs. Ruth Heng – Executive Producer of Far East Beauty Congress (1968–1969)
 Mr. Eric Goh (2018–present) as Managing Director
 Mr. Arnold Vegafria (2018–present) as Talent Manager

Name Changes 

 Miss Malaysia (1963–1964)
 Miss Malaysia/World (1965–1989)
 Miss Malaysia World (1991–2007; 2013–2016)
 Miss World Malaysia (2008–2012; 2018–present)

Notes

References

Lists of women in beauty pageants
Beauty pageants in Malaysia